Abramelin is the debut album by Australian death metal band Abramelin. It was released in 1995 by Thrust Records. Shortly after its release, the album was banned in Australia due to the highly offensive nature of the lyrics. The album was reissued by Repulse Records in October 1997 due to lack of distribution outside of Australia, and again in 1998 by Thrust Records as a double-CD which includes the Transgression from Acheron EP, and featured no lyrics in the CD booklet. It was manufactured and distributed through Shock Records.

Track listing

Credits
Abramelin
Simon Dower – vocals
Tim Aldridge – guitars
Justin Wornes – bass
Euan Heriot – drums

Production
Adam Calaitzis – recording
Sally Moore – artwork, concept, image manipulation, band photos
Andrew Halyday – triangular sculpture

References

1995 debut albums
Abramelin (band) albums